Cinchonoideae is a subfamily of flowering plants in the family Rubiaceae and contains about 1700 species in 10 tribes.

Tribes 
 Chiococceae Benth. & Hook.f.
 Cinchoneae DC.
 Guettardeae DC.
 Hamelieae A.Rich. ex DC.
 Hymenodictyeae Razafim. & B.Bremer
 Hillieae Bremek. ex S.P.Darwin
 Isertieae A.Rich. ex DC.
 Naucleeae DC. ex Miq.
 Rondeletieae DC. ex Miq.
 Strumpfieae Delprete & T.J.Motley

External links 

 

 
Gentianales subfamilies
Taxa named by Constantine Samuel Rafinesque